Celine Cairo (born 22 May 1990 in Amsterdam, Netherlands) is a Dutch singer and songwriter. On 14 December 2016, she released her debut album Free Fall on Hector Records (a record label founded by Celine Cairo and her team). She recorded the album with producer Bill Lefler and her band in Death Star Studios, Los Angeles. Before the debut album, she released two EPs: an untitled EP in 2010 and the Follow EP, produced by British artist/producer Fin Greenall (Fink), in 2013.

Biography
Celine Cairo started out as a singer/songwriter in a trio, with Celine on guitar and vocals, Mart Jeninga (HAEVN) on acoustic bass, and Matthijs Lievaart on viola. The trio won several awards, leading to invitations to play at the Amsterdam Concertgebouw and Carnegie Hall (New York). Between 2010 and 2012, Celine attended the conservatory in Amsterdam. Unexpectedly, Edwin Evers (radio 538) started playing her song "Got Me Good", and things began to move in Celine's career. Eventually, she decided to quit the conservatory and continue to make music full-time. She got in touch with Fin Greenall (Fink) and recorded her second EP with him as producer and mentor.

After touring, working with composer Jorrit Kleijnen (HAEVN), lending her vocals on a national TV campaign by the NPO (Dutch Broadcasting Network) on "Iedereen is van de Wereld", she made plans to go to the United States. Cairo travelled to New York and Los Angeles and started writing and co-writing songs for what was to become her debut album Free Fall. On that first trip, in the fall of 2015, she met producer and multi-instrumentalist Bill Lefler, who had previously worked with Laura Jansen, Ingrid Michaelson, Carey Brothers, and Dotan, and runs his own studio called Death Star Studio, in Koreatown, Los Angeles.

Celine came back to Amsterdam with new songs and having found the sound she'd been looking for. She started making plans to return to Los Angeles to record the full album with Lefler in LA. The recording took place in a six-week period in early 2016. Cairo co-produced the album with Lefler and had her band fly over to finish the record together in the last two weeks of the trip.

In 2018, Celine re-recorded all songs from Free Fall in an acoustic setting at studio Helmbreker, Haarlem, which resulted in The Hector Sessions album.

Discography

Singles
 "Free Fall" (2016)
 "Hibernate" (2017)
 "Quicksand" (2017)

References

External links
 

1990 births
Living people
Musicians from Amsterdam
21st-century Dutch singers
21st-century Dutch women singers